The 1999 BMW Open was a men's tennis tournament played on Clay courts in Munich, Germany that was part of the World Series of the 1999 ATP Tour. It was the eighty-third edition of the tournament and was held from April 26 – May 3.

Todd Woodbridge and Mark Woodforde were the defending champions, but did not participate this year.

Daniel Orsanic and Mariano Puerta won the title, defeating Massimo Bertolini and Cristian Brandi 7–6, 3–6, 7–6 in the final.

Seeds

Draw

Finals

References

 

Doubles
Doubles